Araneus gadus is a species of orb weaver in the spider family Araneidae. It is found in the United States. The scientific name of the species was first validly published in 1973 by Herbert Walter Levi.

References

Araneus
Articles created by Qbugbot
Spiders described in 1973